The Copacá River is a river of Amazonas, Brazil. It is a right tributary of the Uarini River.

The Copacá River defines the eastern boundary of the  Baixo Juruá Extractive Reserve, created in 2001.
The floating litter banks of the river are home to a variety of allochthonous insectivore species of fish, particularly of the genera Microglanis and Phenacorhamdia.

See also
List of rivers of Amazonas (Brazilian state)

References

Sources

Rivers of Amazonas (Brazilian state)